Sanumá  or Sanöma is a Yanomaman language spoken in Venezuela and Brazil. It is also known as Sanema, Sanima, Tsanuma, Guaika, Samatari, Samatali, Xamatari and Chirichano. Most of its speakers in Venezuela also speak Ye'kuana, also known as Maquiritare, the language of the Ye'kuana people the Sanumá live alongside in the Caura River basin.

History 
Throughout the centuries, the Yanomami, originally from the Parima range, have spread up toward river valleys on the plains both to the south in Brazil, and to the north in Venezuela. The Sanumá speak one of the four know Yanomami languages. It is in the rainforests of north Brazil and south Venezuela that the groups have lived undisturbed until recently. In the last 40 years or so the western world has been knocking at their doorsteps wanting lumber and gold.

Dialects
Some linguists identify dialects such as Yanoma, Cobari, Caura, and Ervato-Ventuari in Venezuela and Auaris in Brazil. All the dialects are mutually intelligible. In Venezuela, Sanumá is spoken in the vicinity of the Caura and Ervato-Ventuari Rivers in Venezuela, while in Brazil, it is spoken in the Auari River region of Roraima.

There are three dialects spoken in Roraima, Brazil:
Awaris (2,955 speakers)
Aracaçá (29 speakers)
Hokomawä (180 speakers)

References

Further reading
Alcida Ramos, Sanuma Memories: Yanomami Ethnography in Times of Crisis  (University of Wisconsin Press, 1995)
Bruce Parry, Tribe: Adventures in a Changing World (Michael Joseph Ltd, 2007)

Yanomaman languages
Subject–object–verb languages
Isolating languages
Languages of Brazil
Languages of Venezuela